Aaina is a 1993 Indian Hindi-language romantic drama film directed by Deepak Sareen, produced by Yash Chopra and his wife Pamela Chopra. It stars Jackie Shroff, Amrita Singh, Juhi Chawla in lead roles, with Deepak Tijori in a supporting role. The film was a blockbuster hit  and solidified Chawla's career as a leading lady in the 1990s. Singh's performance in a negative role was highly appreciated and is regarded as one of her career-best performances. The film was remade in Telugu as Aayanaki Iddaru (1995), in Tamil as Kalyana Vaibhogam (1997) and in Kannada as Yare Nee Abhimani (2000).

Plot
Rajnesh Mathur, a wealthy businessman has two daughters. Roma, the elder one is very competitive and has always been spoiled. Beautiful and shy, Reema is quite reserved and usually lets Roma take the spotlight. Both grow up to be entirely different, and fall in love with Ravi Saxena.
Always the centre of attention, Roma catches his eye first. Reema is heartbroken but puts on a brave face.

Ravi and Roma's wedding is fixed. Unfortunately, Roma is ambitious to be star in a film and gets an offer on the marriage day. She accepts and leaves Ravi before their wedding. Furious, he marries Reema to save the honour of Mathurs. At first, they're quite uncomfortable. But Ravi eventually falls in love with Reema. Roma returns home in a rage and tells them they'll never be happy as she has been betrayed.

Determined to get Ravi back, Roma is willing to do anything including ruining Reema's life. She creates a lot of trouble like pretending to commit suicide etc. In the end, Reema gives in and leaves her house. Ravi furiously makes Roma understand what the difference is between her and Reema. Roma realises her mistake and reunites Ravi and Reema.

Cast
Jackie Shroff as Ravi Saxena
Amrita Singh as Roma Mathur
Juhi Chawla as Reema Mathur
Deepak Tijori as Vinay Saxena
Saeed Jaffrey as Mr. Mathur
Dina Pathak as grandmother
Maya Alagh as Mohini Mathur
Rajesh Khattar as Sunil Bhatnagar
Vikas Anand as Bhatia
Yunus Parvez as Auctioneer
Virendra Saxena as Pradeep

Soundtrack
All the songs were composed by Dilip Sen and Sameer Sen and lyrics were penned by Sameer.

Awards
39th Filmfare Awards:

Won
Best Supporting Actress – Amrita Singh

References

External links
 

1993 films
Films scored by Dilip Sen-Sameer Sen
1990s Hindi-language films
Yash Raj Films films
Hindi films remade in other languages
Films directed by Deepak Sareen